Synaphea oulopha is a shrub endemic to Western Australia.

It blooms between July and October producing yellow flowers.

It is found on lateritic breakaways and rises along the west coast in the Wheatbelt region of Western Australia between Three Springs and Irwin where it grows in gravelly clay-sandy-loamy soils.

References

Eudicots of Western Australia
oulopha
Endemic flora of Western Australia
Plants described in 1995